József Pintér (born 9 November 1953 in Budapest) is a Hungarian chess Grandmaster and chess writer.  He won the Hungarian Chess Championship in 1978 and 1979.  Pinter gained his grandmaster title in 1982. He is well known for a 1984 brilliancy against his compatriot Lajos Portisch in that year's Hungarian Championship.

Books
 1000 Minor Piece Endings (Caissa Hungary, 2007)
 1000 Rook Endings (Magyar Sakkvilág, 2007)
 1000 Pawn Endings (Magyar Sakkvilág, 2006)
 300 fejtörő (300 Puzzles) (Magyar Sakkvilág, 2006)
 A sakktaktika titkai I, II, III, IV, (Secrets of chess tactics) - with István Pongó, (Magyar Sakkpartner Kiadó, 2002)

References
 Andrew Soltis, The 100 Best Chess Games of the 20th Century, Ranked. McFarlard & Company, Jefferson, NC, 2000

External links

1953 births
Living people
Chess grandmasters
Chess Olympiad competitors
Hungarian chess players
Hungarian chess writers